Barnwell County is a county in the U.S. state of South Carolina. As of the 2020 census, its population was 20,589. Barnwell County is part of the Augusta-Richmond County, GA-SC Metropolitan Statistical Area. It is located in the Central Savannah River Area. Its county seat is Barnwell.

History
The Barnwell District was created in 1797 (effective in 1800) from the southwestern portion of the Orangeburg District, along the Savannah River. It was named after John Barnwell, a local figure in the Revolutionary War.

In 1868, under the South Carolina Constitution revised during Reconstruction, South Carolina districts became counties. The government was made more democratic, with county officials to be elected by male citizens at least 21 years old, rather than by the state legislature as done previously.

In 1871 the legislature took the northwestern portion of the county to form part of the new Aiken County, the only county organized during the Reconstruction era. In 1874 the border with Aiken County was adjusted slightly. This county and Barnwell, with populations of blacks and whites that were nearly equal, had extensive violence in the months before the 1874 and 1876 elections, as groups of paramilitary Red Shirts rode to disrupt black Republican meetings and intimidate voters to suppress black voting. More than 100 black men were killed in Aiken County during the violence, especially at Ellenton, South Carolina.

In 1895 white Democrats in the state legislature passed a new constitution, disfranchising most blacks for more than 60 years by raising barriers to voter registration.

In 1897 the eastern third of the county was taken to form the new Bamberg County. In 1919 most of the southern half of the county was taken to form most of the new Allendale County, thus reducing Barnwell county to its present size.

Geography

State and local protected areas/sites 
 Banksia Hall
 Barnwell State Park

Major water bodies 
 Georges Creek
 Parr Pond
 Pond B
 Salkehatchie River
 Savannah River
 South Fork Edisto River

Adjacent counties
 Aiken County - north
 Bamberg County - east
 Orangeburg County - east
 Allendale County - southeast
 Burke County, Georgia - southwest

Major highways

Major infrastructure 
 Barnwell Regional Airport
 Savannah River Site (part)

Demographics

2020 census

As of the 2020 United States census, there were 20,589 people, 8,360 households, and 5,260 families residing in the county.

2010 census
As of the 2010 United States Census, there were 22,621 people, 8,937 households, and 6,055 families living in the county. The racial makeup of the county was 52.6% white, 44.3% black or African American, 0.6% Asian, 0.4% American Indian, 0.7% from other races, and 1.5% from two or more races. Those of Hispanic or Latino origin made up 1.8% of the population. In terms of ancestry, 11.5% were American, 5.7% were German, and 5.4% were English.

Of the 8,937 households, 34.0% had children under the age of 18 living with them, 41.8% were married couples living together, 20.8% had a female householder with no husband present, 32.2% were non-families, and 28.4% of all households were made up of individuals. The average household size was 2.50 and the average family size was 3.05. The median age was 38.8 years.

The median income for a household in the county was $33,816 and the median income for a family was $41,764. Males had a median income of $35,957 versus $30,291 for females. The per capita income for the county was $17,592. About 20.8% of families and 25.4% of the population were below the poverty line, including 39.6% of those under age 18 and 11.5% of those age 65 or over.

2000 census
As of the census of 2000, there were 23,478 people, 9,021 households, and 6,431 families living in the county.  The population density was 43 people per square mile (17/km2).  There were 10,191 housing units at an average density of 19 per square mile (7/km2).  The racial makeup of the county was 55.18% White, 42.55% Black or African American, 0.35% Native American, 0.39% Asian, 0.03% Pacific Islander, 0.78% from other races, and 0.72% from two or more races.  1.39% of the population were Hispanic or Latino of any race.

There were 9,021 households, out of which 34.80% had children under the age of 18 living with them, 47.40% were married couples living together, 19.30% had a female householder with no husband present, and 28.70% were non-families. 25.60% of all households were made up of individuals, and 10.20% had someone living alone who was 65 years of age or older.  The average household size was 2.57 and the average family size was 3.08.

In the county, the population was spread out, with 28.10% under the age of 18, 8.70% from 18 to 24, 27.90% from 25 to 44, 22.60% from 45 to 64, and 12.60% who were 65 years of age or older.  The median age was 36 years. For every 100 females there were 92.70 males.  For every 100 females age 18 and over, there were 86.50 males.

The median income for a household in the county was $28,591, and the median income for a family was $35,866. Males had a median income of $31,161 versus $21,904 for females. The per capita income for the county was $15,870.  About 17.90% of families and 20.90% of the population were below the poverty line, including 27.30% of those under age 18 and 24.40% of those age 65 or over.

Government and politics
Prior to 1948, Barnwell County was a Democratic Party stronghold similar to the rest of the Solid South, with Democratic presidential candidates receiving near-unanimous margins of victory in most years. The twenty years from 1948 to 1968 were a highly transitional time for the politics of South Carolina & Barnwell County, largely in part due to the Democratic Party's increasing support for African-American civil rights & enfranchisement. Segregationist candidates Strom Thurmond & George Wallace won the county in those aforementioned years, bookended by Democratic wins in 1952 & 1956 & Republican wins in 1960 & 1964. From 1972 on, the county has primarily Republican, but has become more of a swing county in recent years, backing the national winner in every presidential election from 2000 on except for 2020.

Communities

City
 Barnwell (county seat and largest city)

Towns
 Blackville
 Elko
 Hilda
 Kline
 Snelling
 Williston

Notable people
 James Brown (1933-2006), singer
 Rosa Louise Woodberry (1869–1932), journalist, school founder
 Sarah Lowe Twiggs (1839-1920), poet

See also
 List of counties in South Carolina
 National Register of Historic Places listings in Barnwell County, South Carolina
 South Carolina State Parks

References

External links

 
 
 Barnwell County history and images

 
1800 establishments in South Carolina
Populated places established in 1800